Port Harcourt Cemetery is a city-owned and operated public cemetery located along Aggrey Road in the Old Township district of Port Harcourt, the Rivers State capital. It is the oldest cemetery still in use in the city and is notable as the burial site of activist Ken Saro-Wiwa and his associates the Ogoni Nine. It also contains one commonwealth burial of soldiers of World War II.

Interments
 Ken Saro-Wiwa (1941–1995), writer and activist
 Mike Lloyd Toku (1993–2012)
 Stephen Edward Murray-Bruce (1939–2013)

See also
 List of cemeteries in Nigeria

References

External links
 

Cemeteries in Port Harcourt
Landmarks in Port Harcourt